Academic press may refer to:
 An independent commercial press or subsidized university press focusing on the academic publishing market
 Academic Press, an academic publishing company

See also 
 Library publishing
 University press
 

  (SAV)
  (AVA)
  (ADEVA)
 Akademische Verlagsgesellschaft (disambiguation)